This article lists notable military accidents involving nuclear material. Civilian accidents are listed at List of civilian nuclear accidents. For a general discussion of both civilian and military accidents, see nuclear and radiation accidents. For other lists, see Lists of nuclear disasters and radioactive incidents.

Scope of this article
In listing military nuclear accidents, the following criteria have been adopted:
 There must be well-attested and substantial health risks associated with nuclear materials.
 To qualify as "military", the nuclear operation/material must be principally for military purposes.
 To qualify as "accident", the damage should not be intentional, unlike in nuclear warfare.

This list may be incomplete due to military secrecy.

1940s

1950s

1960s

1970s

1980s

1990s

2000s

2010s

See also

1983 Soviet nuclear false alarm incident
International Nuclear Event Scale
List of accidents and incidents involving military aircraft
Lists of disasters
Nuclear weapon
Radiation
United States military nuclear incident terminology
Vulnerability of nuclear plants to attack

Notes and references

Bibliography 
 Annotated bibliography from the Alsos Digital Library for Nuclear related Issues and Incidents
  Jean-Hugues Oppel, Réveillez le président !, Éditions Payot et rivages, 2007. The book is a fiction about the nuclear weapons of France; the book also contains about ten chapters on true historical incidents involving nuclear weapons and strategy  (during the second half of the twentieth century).
 Nilsen, Thomas, Igor Kudrik and Alexandr Nikitin. Russian Northern Fleet: Sources of Radioactive Contamination. Bellona Report 2:1996, 28. August 1996.
 
The Limits of Safety (1993, Princeton University Press) by Scott Sagan

External links
ProgettoHumus: From Trinity Test to... List of nuclear explosions in the world
ProgettoHumus List of all nuclear accidents in the history (updated)
Bibliography of military nuclear accidents from the Alsos Digital Library for Nuclear Issues
Official List of accidents involving nuclear weapons from the UK Ministry of Defence
Schema-root.org: Nuclear Power Accidents  2 topics, both with a current news feed
US Nuclear Regulatory Commission (NRC) website with search function and electronic public reading room
International Atomic Energy Agency website with extensive online library
Concerned Citizens for Nuclear Safety Detailed articles on nuclear watchdog activities in the US
Radiation Doses Background on ionizing radiation and doses, World Nuclear Association
Canadian Centre for Occupational Health & Safety More information on radiation units and doses.
Radiological Incidents Database Extensive, well-referenced list of radiological incidents.
20 Mishaps That Might Have Started Accidental Nuclear War A handy (if somewhat chilling) list of close calls.
US Nuclear Weapons Accidents list published by the Center for Defense Information (CDI)
Trinity Atomic Bomb by U.S. National Atomic Museum

 

Lists of nuclear disasters
Nuclear
Nuclear technology-related lists